Jommeke is a Belgian comic strip series in publication since 1955. It was created by Jef Nys and can be defined as a humoristic children's adventure series. Jommeke, an 11-year-old boy, is the series' main protagonist. It was originally published in Kerk en Leven, before moving to Het Volk, where it ran until the newspaper ceased to exist in 2010. It is now published in Het Nieuwsblad, De Gentenaar and De Standaard.

Jommeke is very popular in Flanders and, together with Suske en Wiske, is the best-selling comic strip in the region. However, its success has always remained a phenomenon in Belgium and the Netherlands, and attempts at marketing foreign translations have all failed.

History
The first appearance of Jommeke was on 30 October 1955, as a gag-a-day strip in the Flemish magazine Kerk en Leven. After moving to another newspaper, Het Volk, in 1958, Jommeke became a full length adventure comic strip, while Nys also continued Jommeke gag pages in 't Kapoentje. Jommeke has sold 51 million albums in Belgium alone, which means an average of about 4.5 albums per person. This makes Jommeke the best-selling comic book series in Belgium behind Suske en Wiske. There's also a newspaper for children called "Jommekeskrant", which is delivered weekly together with popular Belgian newspaper "Het Nieuwsblad".

Main characters

 Jommeke: An 11-year-old boy who lives with his parents in Zonnedorp. He has no siblings, but he has a parrot named Flip who accompanies him everywhere. He is clever, honest, brave, loves adventure, and is recognizable by his distinct blonde haircut.
 Flip:  A red-winged, green parrot who is Jommeke's pet. Flip is able to talk like a human and is highly intelligent, if somewhat arrogant. His real name is "Filipus", but he prefers "Flip". He is cool-headed and has on several occasions saved the day using his wit and his unique abilities as a bird such as flying, using his beak and taking advantage of his small size to spy and sneak. Although his age is unspecified, he has shown adult behavior, on a few rare occasions, by consuming alcohol and smoking cigars. He is also quite the womanizer, usually unsuccessfully, due to the fact he is a parrot and not a human.
 Filiberke: Jommeke's best friend, Filiberke joins him on most of his adventures. His pitch-black hair color contrasts nicely with the protagonist. He is creative, and a bit odd too. Many albums start with Filiberke engaging in some crazy activity relating to the main story (e.g. he's "playing a cucumber" at the start of album 146 Komkommer in 't zuur). He also often pretends to be sick to the annoyance of the other characters.
 Pekkie: Filiberke's black poodle. 
 Annemieke and Rozemieke: Two identical twin girls, notable for their pony-tails. Their names are often shortened to "The Miekes". They are also good friends with Jommeke. Annemieke even has somewhat of a crush on Jommeke, and Rozemieke on Filiberke. The Miekes are notable for their motherly traits, including cooking and washing. 
 Choco: Choco is a chimpanzee in a sailor suit. He is the Miekes' pet. He earned his nickname due to the fact that he loves to eat chocolate spread (or "choco", as it is named in Belgian Dutch.)
 Professor Gobelijn: An absent-minded professor, notable for his large walrus moustache. He is good-hearted, but frequently makes mistakes because of his absent-mindedness. For instance, he states the exact opposite of what he means, only to correct it immediately afterwards: I.e. "We will arrive next year, I mean tomorrow", "I have completely forgotten, I mean I remember it now." His inventions include pills that make people fly, a car that runs on grass, a submarine in the shape of a whale etc. In "Purpere Pillen" (Purple Pills) Jommeke and Filiberke saved Gobelijn's life. A plaque on his mansion states that he is a "Professor in Everything", i.e. he has a degree on any subject imaginable.
 Anatool: The main antagonist of the series. He is an untrustworthy butler who often resorts to theft and often fulfills the role of antagonist in the stories. He always wears old-fashioned shoes with elevated heels.
 Kwak and Boemel: Two hoboes who live in an underground house in the middle of the forest. Sometimes they side with Jommeke and his friends, but most of the time they are their opponents. They don't shy away from stealing, kidnapping and collaborating with Anatool to get rich. Also notable are their speech impediments. Kwak makes unnecessary use of the letter "h" in front of words that start off with a syllable. Boemel switches the letters "b" and "p" and the letters "d" and "t" in every word he says.
 De Koningin van Onderland: Prutelia van Achterberg, better known as "The Queen of Onderland", is a mentally ill woman who thinks she is a queen. She is Jommeke's most dangerous and ruthless opponent and the true villain of the series. She frequently escapes from her local asylum and then flees to her castle in Zonnedorp. In the third album "De Koningin van Onderland" (1959) she kidnapped all the children in Zonnedorp to become her personal slaves.

List of albums
As of June 2020, the following Jommeke albums exist:

Translations
Apart from some editions for the Netherlands, Jommeke has been translated into French, English, Finnish and Swedish. These translations were not commercially successful. 

A German edition was published from 1971 until around 1980 and lasted 32 volumes (the original comics were printed out of order and volumes 27-28 do not exist!) by Gemini Verlag (1-18) and Europress (19-26, 29-34). The series title was (Die tollen Abenteuer von) Peter + Alexander, obviously a play of words on Austrian actor and singer Peter Alexander.

In 2011, German editor  began republishing the German version of Jommeke, keeping original names and places. As of April 2021, 26 titles have been published in this series.

The series was also published in translation as Jeremy in Indonesia, by children's book publisher BIP (Bhuana Ilmu Populer) in 2013.

In 2018, a Chinese translation was published in cooperation with Bright Media, with an initial run of 25 titles.

Jommeke in other media

In 1968, Jef Nys directed a live-action film called "De Schat van de Zeerover" ("The Pirate's Treasure"), which was a low-budget adaptation of the eponymous Jommeke album. It was essentially an amateur project, made by him and his family members and starred his own son in the main role.

Jommeke in popular culture

On 31 July 1997  Jommeke was the first comic book character to receive his own statue in Middelkerke, in front of the casino. It was sculpted by Valeer Peirsman.  On 26 March 2014 Jommeke's statue became a victim of vandalism. It had to be restored and was placed back again on 28 June 2014. On 29 July 2006 Annemieke and Rozemieke also received a statue in Middelkerke, near the Theresiastraat. It was sculpted by Monique Mol. In 2015, it was announced that two other characters from the franchise, Filiberke and Pekkie, would also receive statues on the Zeedijk of Middelkerke.

On 18 June 2011  a wall depicting Jommeke characters was inaugurated near the Frans Halsplein in Antwerp.

On 27 May 2015 a special comic book wall was made in the Lokvogelstraat in Laeken, Belgium. It features a huge wall painting starring Jommeke and the main cast members.

Sources

Belgian comic strips
Belgian comics titles
1955 comics debuts
Humor comics
Adventure comics
Christian comics
Fantasy comics
Male characters in comics
Child characters in comics
Fictional characters from Flanders
Belgian comics adapted into films
Belgian comics characters
Comics characters introduced in 1955
Comics set in Belgium
Comics about dogs
Comics about monkeys
Comics about animals
Works set in Flanders